In astrology, certain stars are considered significant.  Historically, all of the various heavenly bodies considered by astrologers were considered "stars", whether they were stars, planets, other stellar phenomena like novas and supernovas, or other solar system phenomena like comets and meteors.

Fixed and wandering stars

In traditional astrological nomenclature, the stars were divided into fixed stars, Latin stellæ fixæ, which in astrology means the stars and other galactic or intergalactic bodies as recognized by astronomy; and "wandering stars" (Greek: πλανήτης αστήρ, planētēs astēr), which we know as the planets of the Solar System.  Astrology also treats the Sun, a star, and Earth's Moon as if they were planets in the horoscope.  These stars were called "fixed" because it was thought that they were attached to the firmament, the most distant from Earth of the heavenly spheres.

Stars and astrological degrees
Certain of the astrological degrees were identified and known due to their association with a corresponding star.  The astrological degrees that correspond to individual stars must be corrected for the precession of the equinoxes, and as such the astrologer must know when any given position of a fixed star was noted, to make the necessary corrections.

Stars in sidereal and tropical astrology
Traditional Western astrology is based on tropical astrology, which presumes an equal division of the celestial sphere along the ecliptic into twelve equal parts, starting with Aries.  Sidereal astrology, at once the oldest and a recently revived astrological tradition, is more observationally oriented and uses the actual observed position of the stars and the traditional divisions of the zodiac constellations as its starting point.  As a result of the precession of the equinoxes, the observed positions of the zodiac signs no longer correspond to the signs of tropical astrology.

Zodiac

Traditionally, the most important fixed points in the heavens were described by the constellations of the zodiac. Ptolemy's account likens the influence of some of the stars in the zodiac constellations to the planets; he writes, for example, that "The stars in the feet of Gemini (Alhena and Tejat Posterior) have an influence similar to that of Mercury, and moderately to that of Venus."

Non-zodiac constellations in astrology
Vivian E. Robson notes that many of the traditional constellations outside of the zodiac constellations occupy large degrees of arc and typically compass several of the tropical zodiac signs.  Ptolemy referred to stars by reference to the anatomy or parts of the constellations in which they appeared; thus Arcturus he named the "right knee of Boötes".  Most of the Western names of stars, such as Algol or Betelgeuse, are Arabic in origin.  In 1603 the Augsburg lawyer-uranographer Johann Bayer introduced the current classificatory system for the brighter stars, in which stars are identified as belonging to their constellations by Greek letters, in (roughly) descending order of brightness; so that Regulus, brightest star in Leo, is called α Leonis, the brightest star of the Lion.

Astrological meteors

Unpredictable observations in the heavens, including novas and supernovas as well as other phenomena in the heavens such as comets, meteors, parhelions, and even rainbows, were all collected under the name of astrological meteors.  According to Ptolemy, variations in the magnitude of fixed stars portends wind from the direction in which the star lies.  Etymologically, the word meteor describes any phenomenon in the heavens, and derives from the Greek μετέωρον (meteōron), signifying anything in the sky or above the earth; this is the shared origin of English words such as meteoroid and meteorology.

These astrological meteors were typically held to be omens that presaged major world events.  In De nova stella, Tycho Brahe, one of many astrologers who observed the supernova of 1572, stated his belief that the appearance of the supernova heralded the decline of the Roman Catholic Church and stated that the years 1592-1632 would be impacted by the astrological influence of the supernova.  The years corresponded almost precisely with the lifespan of Gustavus Adolphus (1594 - 1632), the king of Sweden who championed the cause of Protestantism during the Thirty Years War.  This apparently successful prediction won Brahe international fame as an astrologer.

Use

According to Nicholas DeVore, while the fixed stars no longer are consulted much in natal astrology, they remain important in aspects of astrological divination such as judicial astrology.  Those astrologers who include them in natal charts do not give a major star any significance unless it appears as part of a close conjunction with a birth planet, within 5° by celestial longitude, and 1° by latitude.  They have no effect by means of aspect.  A first magnitude or brighter star on the Ascendant or Midheaven in the horoscope may indicate celebrity.  The two stars Aldebaran and Antares are said to produce stress when they transit one of the angles of the horoscope.

Some astrologers that consult the stars refer to their affects as paranatellonta, or "paran" for short. Paranatellonta are stars that fall upon one of the four angles of the horoscope (rising or setting, at the midheaven, or at the imum coeli) at the same time a significant planet is at one of those points.  Thus, for example, if Sirius was rising while Jupiter was at the midheaven, Sirius would be considered a paran of Jupiter and could influence the way the astrologer interpreted Jupiter in that horoscope.

Specific fixed stars

Aldebaran
Astrologically, Aldebaran is a fortunate star, portending riches and honor. This star, named "Tascheter" by the Persians, is one of the four "royal stars" of the Persians from around 3000 BC. These stars were chosen in such way that they were approximately 6 hours apart in right ascension. Each of these stars was assigned to a season, Aldebaran was prominent in the March sky and as such, it was associated with the vernal equinox.  Its current celestial longitude is 09 Ge. 47 .

To medieval astrologers, Aldebaran was one of fifteen Behenian stars, associated with rubies, milk thistles and the kabbalistic sign .

In Hindu astrology, Aldebaran corresponds to the Rohini Nakshatra.

In Western Sidereal Astrology, computation is based on defining Aldebaran as 15 degrees Taurus precisely.

Algol
In astrology, Algol is one of the most unfortunate stars. Ptolemy referred to it as "the Gorgon of Perseus" and associated it with death by decapitation: mirroring the myth of the hero Perseus' victory over the snake-headed Gorgon Medusa. Historically, it has received a strong association with violence across a wide variety of cultures. Medieval Arabic commanders tried to ensure that no important battle began whilst the light of Algol was weak. Algol was connected to the prognoses in an ancient Egyptian calendar for lucky and unlucky days composed about 3200 years 
ago.

The 17th century English astrologer William Lilly regarded any planet to be afflicted when within five degrees of conjunction.  As of 1986 its celestial longitude was 25 Tau. 55'48.

Algol is also one of the 15 Behenian stars, associated with the diamond and black hellebore, and marked with the kabbalistic sign:

Gienah
Gienah (gamma Corvi) is supposed to have a similar effect to Mars and Saturn, tending to promote greed and craftiness.

Procyon
Astrologically, Procyon is considered mostly unfortunate although it is sometimes wealth producing. It has strong potential as a cause of violence; it brings sudden success then disaster. It is of the nature of Mars (and also Mercury to a lesser extent), and when Mars is found conjoined to this star, the native with this configuration will often be an offender of mischief and violence, that is, if these stars are found upon one of the 4 angles of the chart, during the day, with the Moon making a testimony to them while increasing in light. It is also one of fifteen Behenian stars, associated with agate and water crowfoot.

Sirius
In the astrology of the Middle Ages, Sirius was a Behenian fixed star, associated with beryl and juniper. Its kabbalistic symbol  was listed by Heinrich Cornelius Agrippa.  Its celestial longitude was 14 Can. 05 as of 2006.

Vega
Vega (or Wega) takes its name from a loose transliteration of the Arabic word  meaning "falling". Its constellation (Lyre) was represented as a vulture or eagle so that Vega was referred to as the 'falling vulture/eagle'. This is a Pole star. Around 12,000 BC the pole was pointed only five degrees away from Vega and through precession, the pole will again pass near Vega around AD 14,000. 
Medieval astrologers counted Vega as one of the Behenian stars and related it to chrysolite and winter savory. Cornelius Agrippa listed its kabbalistic sign  under Vultur cadens, a literal Latin translation of the Arabic name. Its celestial longitude was 15 Cap. 19 as of 2006. In Vedic Astrology the Nakshatra Abhijit is known as Vega.

See also
Planets in astrology
Asteroids in astrology

References

External links 
 Fixed stars

Technical factors of astrology
History of astrology
Astrology